Vladimir Anatolyevich Grechnyov (born 25 July 1964) is a Russian professional football coach and a former player.

Club career
He made his professional debut in the Soviet Top League in 1984 for PFC CSKA Moscow.

Honours
 Soviet Top League bronze: 1988.
 Soviet Cup winner: 1986.
 Soviet Cup finalist: 1988, 1989, 1991.
 Israeli Premier League champion: 1993.

European club competitions
With FC Torpedo Moscow.

 UEFA Cup Winners' Cup 1986–87: 3 games.
 UEFA Cup 1988–89: 2 games, 1 goal.
 UEFA Cup Winners' Cup 1989–90: 4 games, 2 goals.
 UEFA Cup 1990–91: 2 games.

References

1964 births
Footballers from Moscow
Living people
Soviet footballers
Soviet expatriate footballers
Russian footballers
Soviet Top League players
Russian Premier League players
Israeli Premier League players
PFC CSKA Moscow players
FC Torpedo Moscow players
FC Torpedo-2 players
Beitar Jerusalem F.C. players
Hapoel Rishon LeZion F.C. players
FC Energiya Volzhsky players
Expatriate footballers in Israel
Expatriate footballers in Poland
Russian football managers
Russian expatriate footballers
Association football midfielders
FC Moscow players
Soviet expatriate sportspeople in Poland
Russian expatriate sportspeople in Israel
FC Torpedo Vladimir players